Luís Fernando Lojudice Martinez (born April 21, 1980 in Magda), sometimes known as just Martinez, is a Brazilian midfielder. He currently is playing for Criciúma.  His name is pronounced with stress on the final syllable.

Honours

Cruzeiro
Brazilian Série A: 2003
Brazilian Cup: 2003
Minas Gerais State Championship: 2003, 2004, 2006

Palmeiras
São Paulo State Championship: 2008

References

External links

 Guardian Stats Centre
 zerozero.pt
 palmeiras.globo.com

Living people
1980 births
Brazilian footballers
Brazilian expatriate footballers
Footballers from São Paulo (state)
Cruzeiro Esporte Clube players
Guarani FC players
Sociedade Esportiva Palmeiras players
Sport Club Internacional players
Cerezo Osaka players
Clube Náutico Capibaribe players
Criciúma Esporte Clube players
Campeonato Brasileiro Série A players
J1 League players
J2 League players
Expatriate footballers in Japan
Brazilian people of Spanish descent
Association football midfielders